Clavulina is a genus of fungus in the family Clavulinaceae, in the Cantharelloid clade (order Cantharellales). Species are characterized by having extensively branched fruit bodies, white spore prints, and bisterigmate basidia (often with secondary septation). Branches are cylindrical or flattened, blunt, and pointed or crested at the apex, hyphae with or without clamps, basidia cylindrical to narrowly clavate, mostly with two sterigmata which are large and strongly incurved and spores subspherical or broadly ellipsoid, smooth, and thin-walled, each with one large oil drop or guttule. The genus contains approximately forty-five species with a worldwide distribution, primarily in tropical regions. Species of Clavulina are mostly ectomycorrhizal. A recent study has identified Clavulina to the genera level as present on  Nothofagus menziesii adventitious roots

Species

C. alutaceosiccescens
C. amazoensis
C. amethystina
C. amethystinoides
C. arcuatus
C. brunneocinerea
C. caespitosa
C. cartilaginea
C. cavipes
C. cerebriformis
C. chondroides
C. cinerea
C. cinereoglebosa
C. cirrhata
C. coffeoflava
C. connata
C. copiosocystidiata
C. coralloides
C. craterelloides
C. cristata
C. decipiens
C. delicia
C. dicymbetorum
C. effusa
C. floridana
C. gallica
C. geoglossoides
C. gigartinoides
C. gracilis
C. griseohumicola
C. hispidulosa
C. humicola
C. humilis
C. incrustata
C. ingrata
C. iris
C. kunmudlutsa
C. leveillei
C. limosa
C. monodiminutiva
C. mussooriensis
C. nigricans
C. ornatipes
C. panurensis
C. puiggarii
C. purpurea
C. ramosior
C. rugosa
C. samuelsii
C. septocystidiata
C. sprucei
C. subrugosa
C. tasmanica
C. tepurumenga
C. urnigerobasidiata
C. vinaceocervina
C. viridula
C. wisoli

Distribution
Clavulina species are important primary colonizers of forest litter, and occur immediately after the pre-monsoon showers. Two species of Clavulina – C. coralloides(known as white or crested coral fungus) and C. rugosa – have been recorded from the moist-deciduous to evergreen forests of the Western Ghats, Kerala, India.

References

 
Agaricomycetes genera
Taxa named by Joseph Schröter
Taxa described in 1888